The Santa Ana Observation Tower (Spanish: Torre de observación de Santa Ana), better known as the Stone Tower (La Torre de Piedra), is an approximately 30 feet tall observation tower located at the summit of Monte del Estado, Santa Ana Peak, at the boundary between the municipalities of San Germán and Maricao, within the Maricao State Forest in southwestern Puerto Rico.

The tower was built in 1940 by the Civilian Conservation Corps, who were also responsible for the building of trails, camps and infrastructure in other parks such as El Yunque and Toro Negro. It was added to the National Register of Historic Places in 2016 along with other properties across Puerto Rico under the listing of New Deal Era (1931-1942) Constructions in the Forest Reserves of Puerto Rico.

References 

1940 establishments in Puerto Rico
Buildings and structures in San Germán, Puerto Rico
Buildings and structures on the National Register of Historic Places in Puerto Rico
Tourist attractions in Puerto Rico
Maricao, Puerto Rico
Observation towers
Buildings and structures completed in 1940
Civilian Conservation Corps in Puerto Rico
American Craftsman architecture in Puerto Rico